Greek law may refer to either

Ancient Greek law, or
the Greek continuation and expansion of Roman law in the east, Byzantine law, or
Greek law (Hellenic Republic), the law of modern Greece, the Hellenic Republic.